Bonneville Mountain is an  mountain summit located in Wallowa County, Oregon, US.

Description

Bonneville Mountain is located eight miles south of Joseph, Oregon, in the Wallowa Mountains. It is set within the Eagle Cap Wilderness on land managed by Wallowa–Whitman National Forest. The peak is situated south of Wallowa Lake and precipitation runoff from the mountain drains west into West Fork Wallowa River and east into the East Fork.

Etymology

This landform's toponym was officially adopted in 1925 by the United States Board on Geographic Names to honor Benjamin Bonneville (1796–1878), an officer in the United States Army and explorer of the American West noted for his expeditions to the Oregon Country. Captain Bonneville and his party are credited with the first documented entry into the Wallowa Valley by a non-native in 1834. This mountain was originally known as Middle Mountain.

Climate

Based on the Köppen climate classification, Chief Joseph Mountain is located in a subarctic climate zone characterized by long, usually very cold winters, and mild summers. Winter temperatures can drop below −10 °F with wind chill factors below −20 °F. Most precipitation in the area is caused by orographic lift. Thunderstorms are common in the summer.

See also
 List of mountain peaks of Oregon

Gallery

References

External links

 Weather forecast: Bonneville Mountain

Mountains of Oregon
Mountains of Wallowa County, Oregon
North American 2000 m summits
Wallowa–Whitman National Forest